Aldrans Transmitter was a facility for medium wave broadcasting at Aldrans
near Innsbruck in Austria. 

Originally built in 1927, using a T-antenna hung on two 151 metre tall guyed masts, the station was modernized between 1953 and 1955. The power of the transmitters were increased and two mast radiators insulated against the ground were built. There was also a shortwave transmitter installed.

It was shut down on 1 March 1984 and afterwards dismantled.

References

External links
 
 http://www.skyscraperpage.com/diagrams/?b58034

Former radio masts and towers
Radio masts and towers in Europe